Karya Binayak is a Hindu temple located in Bungamati, Lalitpur District.  It is about ten kilometres south of Kathmandu.

History
The Karyabinayak Temple was dedicated on the fourth Thursday of the month of Chait in Nepal Samvat 781 (1661 AD) under the leadership of local leader Purna Singh of Bungamati.  Worship originally took place on a naturally formed stone in the shape of the deity, Ganesha.  Now, a statue of Ganesha—covered with artistic silver—is kept inside the temple.

Deities and worshippers
Karyabinayak is one of the four famous Vinayakas of Kathmandu Valley.  Before starting any work, devotees come to Karyabinayak to wish for the successful completion of that work.   The site gets very crowded on Tuesdays and Saturdays.

Most of the priests who serve at the temple carry the surname 'Tuladhar'.  The association of priests is called the 'Nine Priests Association'.  On the day of Paha Chahre (during the Ghoda Jatra) there is a Karyabinayak deity procession in Bungamati, at a place the people of Bungamati call "Gale", which means forest.  Karyabinayak is also a famous picnic spot.

Architecture
The small temple is built in a tiered style, that was renovated during the reign of King Mahendra.

Notes

References

External links
 Karya Binayak Temple at Lonely Planet – Nepal

See also
 List of Hindu temples in Nepal

Hindu temples in Lalitpur District, Nepal
Ganesha temples